For 2007, the Canadian Major Indoor Soccer League played a "Showcase Season," or an exhibition schedule, to create interest and test the markets.

Teams
Calgary United FC
Edmonton Drillers
Winnipeg Alliance FC
Saskatoon Accelerators

Schedule

Final standings

Sources

Canadian Major Indoor Soccer League
Indoor
Canadian Major Indoor Soccer League seasons